Rona Ellen Glynn (24 September 1936 –  4 January 1965), also known briefly as  Rona Schaber after marriage,  was the first Indigenous Australian school teacher and nurse in Alice Springs in the Northern Territory. In 1965 she became the first Aboriginal woman to have a pre-school named in her honour in Australia.

Early life and family
Rona Ellen Glynn was born on 24 September 1936 at Wood Green Station in Central Australia, the daughter of Ron Price and Topsy Glynn, a housemaid and cook for R. H. Purvis (Ron Purvis Sr), owner of Wood Green.

Rona's mother, Topsy Glynn, was born around 1916, the daughter of a "half-caste" stockman called James Glynn and an unnamed Aboriginal woman. She was later described by the authorities as a "three-quarter-caste aboriginal". After Topsy's mother was killed, around 1919, Ron Purvis Sr persuaded the NT police commissioner Robert Stott to put Topsy in to the "Half-caste Institution Alice Springs" (The Bungalow, then at the Alice Springs Telegraph Station), although she was not technically "half-caste", on condition that Purvis employed her on Wood Green Station as soon as she had completed her schooling there, which he did. Glynn gave birth to two daughters on Atartinga /Wood Green. The first of these was Rona, born in 1936, whose father was Ron Price. Rona's half-sister, whose father was Rona's father's brother, Alf Price, was the photographer and media specialist who co-founded CAAMA, Freda Glynn, born in 1939. They are both granddaughters of Isobelle Violet Price (Hesketh), the first lone woman to run a station, after her husband Fred, telegraph master of Alice Springs Telegraph Station, had died.

Topsy was again admitted to The Bungalow on 12 Sept 1939, when Freda was just three weeks old and Rona was three years old, as there were post-birth health issues to be attended to, the authorities were trying to determine who Freda's father was, and owing to "the promiscuous manner in which Topsy was giving birth to half-caste infants at Wood Green station it was...considered to be in the girls best interests for her and her children to remain in the Institution". Topsy was not keen to return to the station, as she was employed by Purvis "as housemaid and cook and had also done stockwork and windmill repair work around the station and in return had only received clothing and rations", and was happy working as a laundress at the institution. However, by November 1940, Topsy was again working for Purvis at Wood Green under an agreement similar to that which governed the employment of half-caste girls in the township.

Following the bombing of Darwin in February 1942, there were military orders to evacuate The Bungalow, so Topsy went to find work on a farm in New South Wales with her girls. However bad circumstances there caused her to leave, and she was taken in by a couple in the Sydney suburb of Vaucluse as a domestic. Freda stayed with her, while the Church Missionary Society helped to place Rona at an Anglican home at Mulgoa, west of Sydney, where Freda later joined her. In late May 1942 a number of other children from The Bungalow were escorted to Mulgoa via Adelaide (and possibly Melbourne as well).

Education
In 1949, the sisters were placed in St. Mary's Hostel in Alice Springs, under the care of Sister Eileen Heath. St Mary's was run by the Australian Board of Missions, and provided accommodation and schooling for Aboriginal children who had been either placed there by their parents or by the Director of Native Affairs. Several returning evacuees were placed there after the war. 

In September 1950, Rona wrote an article for the Centralian Advocate about the moving and redecoration of some classrooms at her school.

Glynn did well at school, and gained her Intermediate Certificate in four subjects at Alice Springs Higher Primary School around 1951, a feat achieved by very few Aboriginal children at the time.

Career

The accompanying photo shows Rona – the tallest girl in the back row – and sister Erica, to her right (viewer's left) during this time. In 1953, both Freda and Rona are listed as wards of the N.A.B., with Freda a school student while Rona was employed in Alice Springs.

At the age of 16, she became the first Aboriginal school teacher in Central Australia. In 1952 Glynn was appointed by the South Australian Department of Education as junior teacher at the Alice Springs Primary School, taking charge of a Grade 2 class.

In 1954, Glynn moved to Melbourne to train as a nurse. She undertook general training at the Melbourne School of Nursing, graduating in 1957. She gained a triple nursing certificate. The following year she undertook midwifery training at the Royal Women's Hospital, Melbourne, where after completing the year-long course she remained on staff, becoming a charge sister.

In 1962 Glynn returned to Alice Springs, where she became the first Aboriginal Charge Sister (Maternity Ward) at the Alice Springs Hospital. She delivered around 2000 babies. She was known for taking grapefruit from the garden of the matron's quarters and distributing them among the new mothers on the ward. Annoyed, the matron stormed the ward asking whether anyone what was happening to the fruit. Glynn apparently placed her finger to her lips indicating the mothers to be quiet. When the matron left, they continued eating the grapefruit.

Death and legacy

In 1964 Glynn married pastoralist Bill Schaber. She died the following year after complications from childbirth, on 4 January 1965.

A pre-school located at Ross Park Primary School was named Rona Glynn Preschool after her in 1965. She was the first Aboriginal woman to have a pre-school named in her honour in Australia. Over 100 people attended the opening in September 1965.

Footnotes

References

Further reading

1936 births
1965 deaths
People from Alice Springs
Australian nurses
Australian women nurses
Deaths in childbirth